The 2008 Idaho Vandals football team represented the University of Idaho during the 2008 NCAA Division I FBS football season. Idaho competed as a member of the Western Athletic Conference (WAC), and played their home games in the Kibbie Dome, an indoor facility on campus in Moscow, Idaho. The Vandals were led by second-year head coach Robb Akey.

The Vandals finished the season with a 2–10 overall record and 1–7 in conference play, which was the team's ninth-straight season with a losing record. Idaho's two wins were against in-state rival , an FCS program in the Big Sky, and conference foe New Mexico State. The victory over New Mexico State ended a 24-game losing streak against FBS opponents.

Eight of the Vandals' ten losses came by 23 points or more, and against Utah State, Idaho surrendered a third-quarter lead by yielding 28 unanswered points in the final period. Idaho was outgained by conference opponents by 151.6 yards per game on average.

Schedule

Idaho's reported home attendance in 2008 was 92,041 for six games, an average of 15,340 per game.The maximum was 17,000 for the Boise State game on November 15, and the minimum was 15,002 for San Jose State on November 1.

NFL Draft
One Vandal was selected in the 2009 NFL Draft:

List of Idaho Vandals in the NFL Draft

References

External links
Idaho Argonaut – student newspaper – 2008 editions

Idaho
Idaho Vandals football seasons
Idaho Vandals football